The Singapore Kindness Movement is a non-government, non-profit organisation, a registered charity and an Institution of Public Character that executes public education programs aimed at cultivating kindness and graciousness in Singaporean society. It was officially launched in 1997. The movement serves as the successor to the Singapore Courtesy Council that oversaw the National Courtesy Campaign (Singapore) from the 1980s through the 1990s.

History 
The Singapore Kindness Movement (SKM) was initiated in response to Prime Minister Goh Chok Tong’s call to Singaporeans to develop into a more caring and gracious society in the new century.

In his 1996 New Year’s address, stated "We have become a developed economy because we put our minds to it and strive hard to reach our goals. Let us now complement our economic achievements with social, cultural, and spiritual development. Then by the 21st century, Singapore will be a truly successful, mature country, with a developed economy and a gracious society."

PM Goh announced the SKM pilot project in July 1996, when he launched the Singapore Courtesy Campaign. Some 2,000 students from the uniformed groups in 20 secondary schools participated in the pilot project.

The Movement was launched in January 1997, to over 80,000 secondary school students. SKM was officially registered as a non-profit society on 31 January 1997. In March 2001, the National Courtesy Campaign was subsumed by the Movement.

Singapore Kindness Movement was the secretariat of the World Kindness Movement from 2003-2012.

Vision and Mission 
Vision: A kind and gracious Singapore

Mission: To help build a gracious Singapore, the Singapore Kindness Movement aims to encourage the individual to internalise courtesy, kindness and consideration.

Mission statement: To inspire graciousness through spontaneous acts of kindness, making life more pleasant for everyone.

Its main objectives are:
To encourage all Singaporeans to be more kind and considerate.
To enhance public awareness of acts of kindness.
To influence and raise the standards of social behaviour in our society.

Structure 
The SKM organisational structure consists of two main parts: The SKM Council (SKMC) and the SKM Secretariat. The SKM Council comprises members from the private and 19 public sectors.

The Movement is supported by the Ministry of Culture, Community and Youth and funded by a government grant. SKM also secures funds through sponsorships.

The patron of the Movement is Prime Minister Lee Hsien Loong and the current Chairman is Koh Poh Tiong.

The advisor for the Movement is Edwin Tong, Minister for Culture, Community and Youth.

Logo, mascot and icon 

Logo: The two strokes and ovals of the Singapore Kindness Movement logo depicts two people—one who does an act of kindness and the other who receives it. The freehand strokes combine to form a heart. Red symbolises love for your fellow man and green represents caring for the environment, tolerance, creativity, and consideration.

Mascot: Singa the Lion has been the official mascot of the Singapore Kindness Movement. His look has been refreshed since 2014 and is now known as Singa the Kindness Lion.

Yellow Gerbera Daisy: The Yellow Gerbera daisy is a symbol of appreciation that has become synonymous with the notion of kindness and appreciation in Singapore and with the Singapore Kindness Movement.

The Kindness Gallery 
The Kindness Gallery is located at Stamford Court for guests to learn more about kindness and graciousness. Catering to locals who are familiar with past campaigns and tourists who are intrigued by efforts in Singapore to encourage pro-social behaviour.

The Kindness Gallery has also been used for the Kindsville Tour, to help pre-schoolers develop good social etiquette on public transport.

Focus areas 

 Foreign-Local Integration
 Cyberwellness
 Cleanliness
 Neighbourliness
 Road Etiquette
 Public Transport Etiquette
 Parenting
 People With Disabilities (PWD)

References

External links 
 Singapore Kindness Movement Website
 The Pride Website
 Hood Champions Website
 Kindsville Website
 Seed Kindness Fund Website

Society of Singapore
History of Singapore
Singaporean culture
Kindness
1997 establishments in Singapore